This list comprises all players who have participated in at least one league match for Lancaster Rattlers since the team's first season in the USL Premier Development League in 2007. Players who were on the roster but never played a first team game are not listed; players who appeared for the team in other competitions (US Open Cup, etc.) but never actually made an USL appearance are noted at the bottom of the page where appropriate.

A
  Harry Abraham
  Adam Acosta
  Carlos Aguilar
  Moises Alvarez

B
  Alfred Bedrossian
  German Bravo
  Zach Brunner

C
  John Caceyes
  Sam Campanelli
  Kyle Canamar
  Sergio Cedano
  Mark Cipolla
  Benjamin Corrodi

F
  Ricardo Figueroa

G
  Aaron Galvan
  Martin Galvan
  Richard Galvan
  Amadeo Garay
  Jose Garay
  Matthew Garrett
  Alan Gonzalez-Chavez
  Jesse Graham
  Mario Guerrero
  Joel Gunterman

H
  Mauricio Harrie
  Peter Hazdovac
  Hany Helmy
  Antonio Hernandez
  Christian Hernandez
  Brandon Howell
  Mathayo Huma

I
  Miguel Ibarra

J
  Cody Jenison

K
  Tim Knittel

L
  Patrick Labrzycki
  Keith Lambert
  Tony Lawson
  Miguel Adrian Lopez-Jimenez
  Julio Lopez-Meza
  Jesus Lopez
  Ozzie Lopez
  Wilmer Lopez
  Aaron Lott
  Paul Lupanow

M
  Hector Macias
  Jayro Martinez
  Logan McDaniel
  George Medina
  Patrick Morrison

O
  Darryl Odom
  Mario Ornelas
  Danny Ortiz

R
  Carlos Ramos
  Bobby Reiss
  Brandon Reyes
  Taylor Rivas
  Juan Ruiz

S
  Julian R. Salas
  Jesus Salazar
  Beto Sanchez
  Oscar Sandoval
  Patrick Smith

T
  Tremayne Thompson
  Travis Murray

V
  Benjamin Van der Fluit
  Anthony Vigil
  Daniel Vigil
  Jose Rojo Villanueva

W
  Russell Welbourn

Z
  Billy Zaharopoulos

Sources

Lancaster Rattlers
 
Association football player non-biographical articles